The 2010–11 season of the Slovak Superliga (also known as Corgoň Liga due to sponsorship reasons) was the eighteenth season of the first-tier football league in Slovakia, since its establishment in 1993. It began on 17 July 2010 and was completed on 25 May 2011. MŠK Žilina were the defending champions, having won their fifth Slovak league championship the previous season.

Teams
Petržalka were relegated after finishing the 2009–10 season in 12th and last place. They were replaced by 2009–10 1. Liga champions ViOn Zlaté Moravce.

Personnel and kits

Note: Flags indicate national team as has been defined under FIFA eligibility rules. Players and Managers may hold more than one non-FIFA nationality.

Managerial changes

League table

Results
The schedule consisted of three rounds. The two first rounds consisted of a conventional home and away round-robin schedule. The pairings of the third round were set according to the 2009–10 final standings. Every team played each opponent once for a total of 11 games per team.

First and second round

Third round
Key numbers for pairing determination (number marks position in 2009–10 final standings):

Top goalscorers
Updated through matches played on 25 May 2011

Awards

Top Eleven

Goalkeeper:  Petr Bolek (FK Senica)
Defence:   Lukáš Pauschek (ŠK Slovan),  Martin Dobrotka (ŠK Slovan),  Mário Pečalka (MŠK Žilina),  Filip Lukšík (FK Senica)
Midfield:   Karim Guédé (ŠK Slovan),  Marko Milinković (MFK Košice, ŠK Slovan)  Róbert Jež (MŠK Žilina),  Igor Žofčák (ŠK Slovan), 
Attack:  Filip Šebo (ŠK Slovan),  Ondřej Smetana (FK Senica)

Individual Awards

Manager of the season
Stanislav Griga (FK Senica)

Player of the Year
Filip Šebo (ŠK Slovan)

Young player of the Year
Lukáš Pauschek (ŠK Slovan)

See also
2010–11 Slovak Cup
2010–11 Slovak First League

References

External links
 Slovak FA official site 

Slovak
Slovak Super Liga seasons
1